Hangover Square is a 1941 novel by English playwright and novelist Patrick Hamilton. It follows the schizophrenic alcoholic George Harvey Bone and his tortured love for Netta Longdon in the months leading up to the Second World War. Subtitled A tale of Darkest Earl's Court, it is set in that area of London in 1939.

A black comedy, it is often cited as Hamilton's finest novel, exemplifying the author's concerns over social inequalities, the rise of fascism and the impending onset of World War II.

Synopsis
Set against the backdrop of the days preceding Britain declaring war on Germany, the main character is George Harvey Bone, a lonely borderline alcoholic who has a form of dissociative identity disorder, referred to in the text as a "dead mood". An alternative diagnosis is temporal lobe epilepsy. 
He is obsessed with gaining the affections of Netta, a failed actress and one of George's circle of acquaintances with whom he drinks. Netta is repelled by George but, being greedy and manipulative, she and a mutual acquaintance, Peter, shamelessly exploit George's advances to extract money and drink from him.

During his disordered episodes, he is convinced he must kill Netta for the way she treats him. Upon recovering from these interludes, he cannot remember them. However outside these he embarks on several adventures, trying in vain to win Netta's affections, including a would-be romantic trip to Brighton which goes horribly wrong: Netta brings Peter along, and also a previously unknown man with whom she has sex in the hotel room next to George's.

Apart from being a source of money and alcohol, Netta's other reason for continuing to associate with George is because of Johnnie. He is one of George's long-time friends who works for a theatrical agent, and Netta hopes that through him she will get to meet Eddie Carstairs, a powerful figure in the theatre. However, in a final reversal of fortune it is George, not Netta, who ends up attending a party amongst the theatrical great and good whilst Netta is cast aside by Eddie who — unlike George — has immediately seen her for the unpleasant person she is. George suddenly realises what it is like to be surrounded by people who are interested in him as a person rather than for what he can provide.

This potentially promising turn of events in George's life is dashed, however, when he suddenly clicks into a dead mood and resumes his murder plans. He executes his murder of Netta (and also of Peter, whom the narrative describes as a "fascist" moments before he is murdered) before escaping to Maidenhead. Throughout the novel, Maidenhead represents for George a semi-mythical new beginning, representing a picture of traditional Englishness in contrast to the seaminess of Earl's Court, and the place where he once spent an idyllic holiday with his sister Ellen, now long dead, who was one of the few people who had ever loved and understood him. However, in the closing pages of the novel the fallacy of that dream becomes apparent to George: it is just the same as everywhere else. Now penniless, he gasses himself in a dingy Maidenhead boarding house by turning on the gas fire but not lighting it. Domestic coal gas at that time had a high concentration of carbon monoxide which causes death in a few minutes.

Title
The title of the book is a wordplay on the name Hanover Square, an area of London that was once home to many late-night drinking establishments.

Reception and adaptations
Hangover Square was immediately lauded on its publication. James Agee, writing in the Daily Express, called it "a magnificent thriller". Hamilton's friend Michael Sadleir considered it his best novel. John Betjeman in The Spectator referred to it as being in "the top class of English novels".

Such was the novel's success that it was rapidly adapted for a film which was released in 1945. Starring Laird Cregar, Linda Darnell, and George Sanders, significant changes to the novel were made, most notably the plot's re-location to the Edwardian era.

References

External links
 
 
 Novelist John Lucas on 'Hangover Square'

1941 British novels
Novels by Patrick Hamilton (writer)
Novels set in London
Black comedy books
British novels adapted into films
Novels set in Brighton
Fiction set in 1939
Constable & Co. books